This list of largest United States universities by undergraduate enrollment includes only individual four-year campuses, not four-year universities.  Universities can have multiple campuses with a single administration.

What this list includes:
A single Individual campus with a single physical location of a four-year public university within the United States
Enrollment is the sum of the headcount of undergraduate students
Enrollment is counted by the 21st-day headcount, as provided to the United States Department of Education under the Common Data Set program.
Campuses that have small secondary physical locations that are not reported separately (for extended education, outreach, etc.) are indicated with a footnote.

What this list does not include:
University systems, or universities that have multiple physical campuses.

For other lists that measure university enrollment, see the see also section below.

2018–19 enrollment

See also

 List of largest universities in the world by country
 List of largest United States universities by enrollment
 List of United States public university campuses by enrollment

Notes

References

Undergraduate Enrollment
University campuses by undergraduate enrollment
Statistics of education